Argentina was one of the nineteen nations that competed at the Summer Paralympic Games in 1964 held in Tokyo, Japan from November 3 to 12, 1964. The team finished eighth in the medal table with a total of thirty seven medals, six gold, fourteen silver and sixteen bronze. The Argentinian team consisted of twenty four athletes, eighteen male and six female.

Team 
The Argentinian team consisted of twenty four athletes, eighteen male and six female.  The team included Noemi Tortul and Susana Beatriz Olarte. In 2014, the pair would become one of the first two Argentine para-athletes to be recognized by the Congress of Sport and Tourism in Rosario, Argentina.

Medals 
The Argentinian team consisted of twenty four athletes, eighteen male and six female.

Track and field (athletics) 

Argentina entered nine of its twenty four athletes in the athletic events, four male and five female. They won fifteen medals, one gold, six silver and eight bronze. Six individual competitors won a medal, with Olarte and Diz winning four medals each.

Noemi Tortul won a pair of bronze  medals at these Games in the shot put and javelin. Susana Beatriz Olarte won four medals, including a gold in the shot put, silver in javelin and discus, and bronze in the speed race.

Swimming

Argentina entered eight of its nineteen athletes in the swimming events, five male and three female. They won sixteen medals, four gold, six silver and six bronze. All eight individual competitors won a medal, with Cochetti, Faloco and Mier winning three medals each.

Table tennis

Argentina entered three of its nineteen athletes in the table-tennis event, all male. They won 2 medals, all silver. Each competitor won one medal.

Weightlifting

Argentina entered three of its nineteen athletes in the weightlifting event, all male. They won two medals, one gold and one bronze. Bartelli and Brandoni won one medal each.

Wheelchair basketball 

Argentina entered eleven of its twenty four athletes in the wheelchair basketball event, all male. They won one silver medal at the Men's Tournament B incomplete. The team players were: Eduardo Albelo, Héctor Brandoni, Fernando Bustelli, Jorge Diz, Wilmer González, Juan Grusovin, Roberto Iglesias, Federico Marín, Rodolfo Novoa, Juan Sznitowski y Dante Tosi.

Notes

References

Nations at the 1964 Summer Paralympics
1964
Paralympics